The Ferry Point International Bridge is an international bridge, which connects St. Stephen, New Brunswick in Canada and Calais, Maine in the United States, across the St. Croix River.

The bridge connects the two cities' downtowns.

Border crossing

The Ferry Point Bridge Crossing connects the towns of Calais, Maine and St. Stephen, New Brunswick on the Canada–US border at the Ferry Point International Bridge. The current US facility, built in 1935–36, was listed on the National Register of Historic Places in 2014.  The current Canadian facility was built in 1955.

References

External links
 I-95 Corridor Coalition

Road bridges in New Brunswick
Canada–United States bridges
International bridges in Maine
Buildings and structures in Calais, Maine
St. Stephen, New Brunswick
Road bridges in Maine
Plate girder bridges in the United States
Plate girder bridges